Argostemma is a genus of flowering plants in the family Rubiaceae. It can be found in (sub)tropical Asia and western and west-central tropical Africa.

Species

Argostemma acuminatissimum Ridl.
Argostemma aequifolium Ridl.
Argostemma africana K.Schum.
Argostemma angustifolium Miq.
Argostemma anisophyllum Merr.
Argostemma annamiticum Ridl.
Argostemma anupama Sivar.
Argostemma apiculatum B.Bremer
Argostemma arachnosum Merr.
Argostemma attenuatum Valeton
Argostemma bariense Pierre ex Pit.
Argostemma begoniaceum Miq.
Argostemma bicolor King
Argostemma bifolium Ridl.
Argostemma borragineum Blume ex DC.
Argostemma brachyantherum Stapf
Argostemma brevicaule Valeton
Argostemma brookei B.Bremer
Argostemma bryophilum K.Schum.
Argostemma burttii B.Bremer
Argostemma buwaldae Bakh.f.
Argostemma calcicola B.Bremer
Argostemma callitrichum Valeton
Argostemma carstensense Wernham
Argostemma chaii B.Bremer
Argostemma coenosciadicum Suringar
Argostemma concinnum Hemsl.
Argostemma condensum Craib
Argostemma courtallense Arn.
Argostemma cordatum Nuraliev
Argostemma crassinerve Valeton
Argostemma debile Ridl.
Argostemma densifolium Ridl.
Argostemma denticulatum Ridl.
Argostemma discolor Merr.
Argostemma dispar Craib
Argostemma distichum Valeton
Argostemma diversifolium Ridl.
Argostemma dulitense Merr.
Argostemma ebracteolatum Geddes
Argostemma elatostemma Hook.f.
Argostemma elongatum Ridl.
Argostemma enerve Ridl.
Argostemma epitrichum Valeton
Argostemma fallax Bakh.f.
Argostemma fasciculata Sridith & K.Larsen
Argostemma flavescens Bakh.f.
Argostemma fragile Geddes
Argostemma gaharuense B.Bremer
Argostemma geesinkii B.Bremer
Argostemma gracile Stapf
Argostemma grandiflorum Ridl.
Argostemma griseum Valeton
Argostemma hainanicum H.S.Lo
Argostemma hameliifolium Wernham
Argostemma havilandii Ridl.
Argostemma hirsutum Ridl.
Argostemma hirtellum Ridl.
Argostemma hirtum Ridl.
Argostemma hookeri King
Argostemma humifusum W.W.Sm.
Argostemma humile Benn.
Argostemma inaequale Benn.
Argostemma inaequilaterum Benn.
Argostemma invalidum Ridl.
Argostemma jabiense Valeton
Argostemma johorense Ridl.
Argostemma junghuhnii Miq.
Argostemma khasianum C.B.Clarke
Argostemma klossii Ridl.
Argostemma korthalsii Miq.
Argostemma kurzii C.B.Clarke
Argostemma laeve Benn.
Argostemma laevigatum Benn.
Argostemma lanceolarium Ridl.
Argostemma lanceolatum Ridl.
Argostemma laxum Geddes
Argostemma linearifolium Valeton
Argostemma linguafelis Wernham
Argostemma lobbii Hook.f.
Argostemma lobulatum Craib
Argostemma longifolium Benn.
Argostemma longistimula Ridl.
Argostemma longistipula Ridl.
Argostemma macrosepalum Miq.
Argostemma maquilingense Elmer
Argostemma monophyllum Ridl.
Argostemma montanum Blume ex DC.
Argostemma montense Ridl.
Argostemma montisdoormannii Valeton
Argostemma moultonii Ridl.
Argostemma multinervium Ridl.
Argostemma muscicola Ridl.
Argostemma nanum Valeton
Argostemma neesianum Walp.
Argostemma nervosum Ridl.
Argostemma neurocalyx Miq.
Argostemma neurosepalum Bakh.f.
Argostemma nigrum M.R.Hend.
Argostemma nutans King
Argostemma oblongum King
Argostemma oliganthum Kurz
Argostemma ophirense Maingay ex Hook.f.
Argostemma parishii Hook.f.
Argostemma parvifolium Benn.
Argostemma parvum Geddes
Argostemma pauciflorum Blume ex DC.
Argostemma pedicellatum Elmer
Argostemma pedunculosum Miq.
Argostemma perakense King
Argostemma perplexum Merr. & L.M.Perry
Argostemma pictum Wall.
Argostemma phyllocharis 
Argostemma plumbeum Craib
Argostemma propinquum Ridl.
Argostemma psychotrichoides Ridl.
Argostemma puffii Sridith
Argostemma pulchellum Geddes
Argostemma pumilum Benn.
Argostemma pusillum Valeton
Argostemma pygmaeum Valeton
"Argostemma quarantena" Balan
Argostemma reptans Ridl.
Argostemma ridleyi King
Argostemma riparium Ridl.
Argostemma roemeri Valeton
Argostemma rostratum Wall.
Argostemma rotundicalyx Sridith
Argostemma rugosum Ridl.
Argostemma rupestre Ridl.
Argostemma rupestrinum Elmer
Argostemma sarmentosum Wall.
Argostemma saxatile Chun & F.C.How ex W.C.Chen
Argostemma sessilifolium Ridl.
Argostemma siamense Puff
Argostemma solaniflorum Elmer
Argostemma squalens Ridl.
Argostemma stellare Ridl.
Argostemma stellatum Craib
Argostemma stenophyllum Merr.
Argostemma subcrassum King
Argostemma subfalcifolium Bakh.f.
Argostemma subinaequale Benn.
Argostemma succulentum Ridl.
Argostemma sumatranum Boerl. & Koord.
Argostemma tavoyanum Wall. ex Benn.
Argostemma tenue Ridl.
Argostemma teysmannianum Miq.
Argostemma thaithongae Sridith
Argostemma timorense Benn.
Argostemma trichanthum Ridl.
Argostemma trichosanthes Merr.
Argostemma triflorum Ridl.
Argostemma uniflorum Blume ex DC.
Argostemma unifolioloides King
Argostemma unifolium Benn.
Argostemma urticifolium King
Argostemma variegatum Merr.
Argostemma verticillatum Wall.
Argostemma victorianum Nob.Tanaka
Argostemma viscidum Ridl.
Argostemma wallichii Walp.
Argostemma wollastonii Wernham
Argostemma wrayi King
Argostemma yappii King
Argostemma yunnanense F.C.How ex S.H.Lo

References

External links
Argostemma in the World Checklist of Rubiaceae

Rubiaceae genera
Argostemmateae